In epistemology, Sensualism is a doctrine whereby sensations and perception are the basic and most important form of true cognition. It may oppose abstract ideas.

This ideogenetic question was long ago put forward in Greek philosophy (Stoicism, Epicureanism) and further developed to the full by the British Sensualists (John Locke, David Hume) and the British Associationists (Thomas Brown, David Hartley, Joseph Priestley). In the 19th century it was very much taken up by the Positivists (Auguste Comte, Herbert Spencer, Hippolyte Taine, Émile Littré)

See also 
 Empiricism
 Positivism
 Solipsism

Footnotes

Epistemological theories
Empiricism